Astur Club de Fútbol is a Spanish football team based in Oviedo, in the autonomous community of Asturias. Founded in 1923 and later re-founded in 1949, it plays in Tercera División – Group 2, holding home matches at Estadio Hermanos Llana, which has a capacity of 2,000 spectators.

History
In 2003, Astur CF changed its name to Oviedo Astur Club de Fútbol (more commonly known as Oviedo ACF) and its colours to a blue shirt and white shorts, with the aim to substitute Real Oviedo, in that year relegated to Segunda División B and weeks later to Tercera División by financial debts.

After four seasons where Oviedo ACF played one time the promotion playoffs to Segunda División B, in 2007 the club decided to come back to the classical colours and denomination Astur CF.

Season to season

17 seasons in Tercera División

Notable former players
 Berto
 Francisco Castaño
 Jaime Jordán
 Dani López
 Melendi

Notable former coaches
 Enzo Ferrero

External links
Official website 
Futbol en Asturias team profile 
Futbolme.com profile

Sport in Oviedo
Football clubs in Asturias
Association football clubs established in 1949
1949 establishments in Spain